was a Japanese ophthalmologist who reported a condition now known as Vogt–Koyanagi–Harada disease.

Career
He was born in Goryo, Amakusa District, Kumamoto Prefecture in 1892 and grew up in Taragi, Kuma District, and Kumamoto, Kumamoto Prefecture. While attending the Medical Faculty, Tokyo Imperial University, he became an 
army-doctor-to-be. He graduated from Tokyo University in 1917. After studying internal medicine, he entered the Department of Ophthalmology under Shinobu Ishihara in January, 1922.

In December 1922, he first reported "A case of acute diffuse choroiditis with retinal detachment" at a meeting of ophthalmologists in Tokyo; this work became a paper in 1926, recognized for its comprehensive description of what is now known as Vogt–Koyanagi–Harada disease.

He later worked in Nagasaki with his father-in-law, who was also an ophthalmologist. In 1937, he became an army doctor; he was later stationed in the Philippines. In 1945, his office was destroyed by A-bomb. On December 20, 1946, he died of pneumonia at the age of 54.

References
e-Medicine, Vogt-Koyanagi-Harada Disease
Whonamedit

Notes

Japanese ophthalmologists
People from Kumamoto Prefecture
1892 births
1946 deaths